Wreck Your Life is the second studio album by American country/rock band Old 97's, first released on October 3, 1995 (see 1995 in music). The album's title comes from a Texas Department of Transportation bumper sticker with the slogan, "Don't Wreck Your Life". Drummer Philip Peeples removed the first word and applied the sticker to the band's touring van.

Wreck Your Life was the band's first professionally released album, released by Chicago alt-country label Bloodshot Records. The album contains many of the country and bar band elements absent from the later Elektra Records recordings. Four extra songs from these sessions, as well as two singles, were later combined by Bloodshot for the Early Tracks EP. Though the anticipation of the album was immense, the ratings were not very good.

"Doreen" is a re-recording from the band's first album, Hitchhike to Rhome, and an alternate take on "W-I-F-E" can be found on Early Tracks. "Big Brown Eyes" was featured in the series finale of Ned's Declassified School Survival Guide and was re-recorded for the band's next album, Too Far to Care.

The lead song, "Victoria", is a country ballad to Miller's ex-girlfriend, while "Doreen" refers to a memorable fan of Killbilly, a predecessor band featuring Miller and Hammond. "You Belong To My Heart" was made famous by Elvis Presley, while "My Sweet Blue-Eyed Darlin'" is by Bill Monroe. The Robert mentioned in "Big Brown Eyes" (as well as "Drowning In The Days") is Miller's boyhood friend, Robert Jenkins.

In 2009, Bloodshot reissued the album under the title Wreck Your Life... And Then Some: The Complete Bloodshot Recordings. The reissue contains not only the entire original album, but also other obscure songs the band recorded for Bloodshot.

Track listing
All songs by Rhett Miller, Ken Bethea, Murry Hammond and Philip Peeples, except where noted.
"Victoria" - 3:51
"The Other Shoe" - 2:58
"Doreen" - 3:43
"You Belong To My Heart" (Dora Luz and Agustín Lara; English lyrics: Ray Gilbert) - 3:05
"Big Brown Eyes" - 4:25
"Dressing Room Walls" - 3:55
"W-I-F-E" - 3:32
"Bel Air" - 4:05
"My Sweet Blue-Eyed Darlin'" (Bill Monroe; vocals by Murry Hammond) - 2:15
"Old Familiar Steam" - 3:58
"Over The Cliff" - 3:19 (Jon Langford)
"Goin', Goin', Gone" - 3:54

Personnel
Old 97's are:
Ken Bethea - electric guitar
Murry Hammond - bass, vocals & banjo
Rhett Miller - vocals & acoustic guitar
Philip Peeples - trap kit

Additional performances
Jon Langford - guitar on Doreen outro
Chuck Uchida - power chords on Dressing Room Walls
Don Walser - yodeling on Old Familiar Steam outro

References

Old 97's albums
1995 albums
Bloodshot Records albums